Croft is a surname; notable people with this surname include:

Chancy Croft (born 1937), American politician, father of Eric Croft
Chris Croft, American politician
David Croft (broadcaster), "Crofty", British TV commentator
David Croft (TV producer), British TV sitcom writer
Douglas Croft, American actor
Eric Croft (born 1964), American politician, son of Chancy Croft
 George W. Croft (1846–1904), American politician, father of Theodore G. Croft
Henry Croft, Australian-Canadian businessman
Herbert Croft (disambiguation), several people
Henry Page Croft, 1st Baron Croft
James Croft, Lord Deputy of Ireland in the sixteenth century
Jennifer Croft, American translator
Julia Croft, New Zealand performance artist
Mary Jane Croft, American actress
Paddy Croft, actress
Peta-Kaye Croft, Australian politician
Richard Croft (tenor), American operatic tenor
Steven Croft (bishop), Bishop of Oxford
 Theodore G. Croft (1874–1920), American politician, son of George W. Croft
William Croft, English composer
William Croft (linguist), American linguist

Sports 

 Annabel Croft, British tennis player
 Colin Croft, Guyanese cricketer
 Don Croft (born 1949), American football player
 Garan Croft, Welsh boxer
 Gary Croft, English footballer
 Ioan Croft, Welsh boxer
 June Croft, British freestyle swimmer
 Lee Croft, English footballer
 Lee Croft (American football) (1898–1984), American NFL guard
 Robert Croft, Welsh cricketer
 Robert Croft (diver), record-setting American US Navy diver (retired)
 Steven Croft (cricketer), English cricketer
Sydney Croft (1883–1965), English cricketer

Fictional characters 

 Lara Croft, fictional protagonist of the Tomb Raider series

See also
Croft (disambiguation)
Crofts (surname)
Baron Croft, a title in the Peerage of the United Kingdom

English-language surnames